The Chicago Men's Challenger is a professional tennis tournament played on hard courts. It is currently part of the Association of Tennis Professionals (ATP) Challenger Tour. It has been held in Chicago, United States since 2022.

Past finals

Singles

Doubles

References

ATP Challenger Tour
Hard court tennis tournaments
Tennis tournaments in the United States